Sakate (written: 坂手 or 阪手) is a Japanese surname. Notable people with the surname include:

, Japanese rugby union player
, Japanese playwright

See also
Sakatejima, an island of Mie Prefecture, Japan

Japanese-language surnames